Laari  may refer to:
 Maldivian laari, a coin denomination issued by the Maldives
 Lari people (Congo), an ethnic group of the Republic of the Congo
 Laari language, a Bantu language
 Sanna Laari, Finnish biathlete
 Ilkka-Eemeli Laari, Finnish snowboarder

See also 
Lari (disambiguation)